Günther Dengg (born 4 July 1973) is an Austrian former biathlete. He competed in the men's 20 km individual event at the 1998 Winter Olympics.

References

External links
 

1973 births
Living people
Austrian male biathletes
Olympic biathletes of Austria
Biathletes at the 1998 Winter Olympics
People from Schwaz
Sportspeople from Tyrol (state)